The Battle of Ruxu, also known as the Battle of Ruxukou, was fought between the warlords Sun Quan and Cao Cao in 217 in the late Eastern Han dynasty. Two years earlier, Sun Quan attempted to take control of Hefei fortress, but failed due to a sudden plague and the staunch resistance put up by Cao Cao's forces under Zhang Liao. Since then, Cao Cao had been making preparations for a counterattack on Sun Quan, and he personally led his navy to Ruxu to fight a decisive battle.

This battle is not to be confused with another earlier battle that also took place at Ruxu in 213.

The battle
Before Cao Cao's massive army arrived at the battlefield, Sun Quan's second-in-command, Lü Meng, had already started to strengthen the defences of Ruxu fort, leaving the transportation and retreat route open for Sun. Meanwhile, Cao Cao operated his Hefei fortress as a front-line base, stationing his troops there; in addition, Cao Cao ordered Zang Ba and Sun Guan to mobilize their "Qingzhou Corps" to the battlefield. 

When Cao Cao pressed on Ruxu fort, Sun Quan sent out Ling Tong, Xu Sheng and the like to do battle. During the ensuing engagement, Sun Guan was killed in action, and Cao Cao temporarily halted the attack. The development was not as optimistic as Cao had expected, so he set up numerous camps across a river, and prepared for a long-term war. Cao ordered Xiahou Dun to lead his "26 armies" from Juchao to the frontline.

Facing the growing number of Cao Cao's troops, Sun Quan ordered his generals to maintain a line of defensive, which Cao was never able to break.

The tide of battle turned heavily in Sun Quan's favour when Gan Ning led 100 men into Cao Cao's main camp under cover of nightfall and laid waste to the camp, throwing Cao's armies into confusion. Gan Ning and his unit left without any casualties, and the demoralized armies of Cao Cao withdrew from the battle.

Order of battle

Sun Quan forces
Sun Quan
Lü Meng
Jiang Qin
Xu Sheng
Zhou Tai
Gan Ning
Ling Tong
Zhu Ran
Xu Xiang

Cao Cao forces
Cao Cao
Xiahou Dun
Cao Ren
Zhang Liao

In popular culture
The battle is featured as a playable stage in Koei's video game Dynasty Warriors 5: Xtreme Legends. If the player is playing on Sun Quan's side, he can use Gan Ning's night raid to win the battle. In earlier versions of the game, this battle is merged with the Battle of He Fei.

References
 Chen Shou. Records of the Three Kingdoms, Volume 55, Biography of Gan Ning.
 Rafe de Crespigny. Generals of the South.

Ruxu 217
217
Ruxu 217